Dennison J. Lawlor, (January 1, 1824January 1, 1892) was a 19th-century Canadian-Irish shipbuilder and yacht designer. He apprenticed under shipbuilder Whitmore & Holbrook. Lawlor had his own shipyard, building and designing for 40 years some of the finest yachts, pilot boats, and 150 merchant vessels built from his designs. The most notable were the Hesper, Florence, and D. J. Lawlor. Lawlor died in Chelsea, Massachusetts in 1892.

Early life

Dennison J. Lawlor was born on January 1, 1824, in New Brunswick, Canada, the son of James Lawlor and an Irish mother. He came to Boston when he was fifteen years old. Lawlor married Caroline F. Littlefield on February 18, 1847, in Cambridge, Massachusetts. They had four children, one being, Captain Josiah Warren Lawlor, who was born on November 8, 1854, in Chelsea. 

In June 1891, Josiah Lawlor sailed from Crescent Beach, Massachusetts to Land's End on a small 15-foot boat, the Sea Serpent, which was designed by his father. He was lost at sea in 1892 trying to cross the Atlantic on a 12-foot boat.

Career

Lawlor started his career serving his apprenticeship with Whitmore & Holbrook shipbuilders. He established the Dennis J. Lawler shipyard in East Boston at the corner of Condor and Meridian Streets. He was a shipbuilder and yacht designer for over 40 years. Over 150 merchant vessels were built from his designs. The most notable were the Hesper, Florence, and The D. J. Lawlor. Lawlor's pilot boats from 1865 had sharp hollow bows and round sterns.

He became friends and mentor to ship designer Thomas F. McManus and the McManus family, which continued through his lifetime. McManus used Lawlor's genius to design their new schooners.

During his career, Lawlor designed and built the following schooners:

During 1884-85, Lawlor's Chelsea shipyard shut down due to foreclosure.

Death

Lawlor died of cancer, at age 68, on January 1, 1892, at Chelsea, Massachusetts. He was buried at Mount Auburn Cemetery. Ship designer Tom McManus was one of the mourners at the funeral.

Legacy

Lawlor will be remembered as a designer of some of the most well built pilot boats and fishing vessels ever seen in the New England waters. He was one of the greatest competitor of George Steers in schooner design.

See also
 List of Northeastern U. S. Pilot Boats
 List of sailboat designers and manufacturers

References 

 

Canadian shipbuilders
1892 deaths
1824 births
People from Saint John, New Brunswick